Sunk Rock Lighthouse is one of three lighthouses in the Mumbai Harbour off the coast of Mumbai, India. The tower is mounted on a stone pier and painted in a red and yellow checkerboard pattern, with the lantern and gallery painted white. Swimming races are often held between the Gateway of India and the Lighthouse, a distance of 5 kilometres (3 statute miles). The site is operated by the Mumbai Port Trust.

See also

 List of lighthouses in India

References

External links
Directorate General of Lighthouses and Lightships
Picture of Sunk Rock Lighthouse

Lighthouses in India
Government buildings in Mumbai
1884 establishments in India
Lighthouses completed in 1884
Transport in Mumbai